The 2013–14 Lega Basket Serie A was the 92nd season of the Lega Basket Serie A.

The regular season ran from October 13, 2013 to May 11, 2014 and consisted of 30 games. The top 8 teams made the play-offs, the lowest ranked team, Sutor Montegranaro, were relegated to Serie A2 Gold.

EA7 Emporio Armani won its 26th championship and their first national title since 1996, ending Montepaschi Siena's streak of Serie A titles at seven.

Arena standards
Starting from the 2013-14 season all clubs must play in arenas that seat at least 5,000 people. However 8 teams that did not have arenas of that size were allowed for this season to play in their old arenas with improvements.

Teams

Regular season

Individual Statistics, Regular Season

Points

Assists

Rebounds

Steals

Blocks

Valuation

Play-offs

EA7 Emporio Armani Milano vs. Giorgio Tesi Group Pistoia

Banco di Sardegna Sassari vs. Enel Brindisi

Montepaschi Siena vs. Grissin Bon Reggio Emilia

Acqua Vitasnella Cantù vs. Acea Roma

Semifinals

EA7 Emporio Armani Milano vs. Banco di Sardegna Sassari

Montepaschi Siena vs. Acea Roma

Finals

EA7 Emporio Armani Milano vs. Montepaschi Siena

Awards
Most Valuable Player:
 Drake Diener (Dinamo Sassari)
Finals MVP:
 Alessandro Gentile (EA7 Emporio Armani Milano)

References

External links
  

Lega Basket Serie A seasons
1
Italy